TXT or txt may refer to:

Technology 
 SMS language or txt, an Internet slang language commonly used on short message service phones
 .txt, a filename extension for text files
 Text messaging on a phone using letters and symbols
 Trusted Execution Technology, Intel's implementation of Trusted Computing
 TXT records, a type of Domain Name System record; see List of DNS record types

Arts and media
 Tomorrow X Together, a South Korean boy band
 TxT (film), a 2006 Filipino horror film

Other uses
 txt, the ISO639-3 language code for Citak language, a Papuan language spoken in Citak-Mitak kecamatan (subdistrict), Mappi Regency, Indonesia
 TXT e-solutions an international software development and consulting company
 Docetaxel, an anti-cancer drug
 Textron, a manufacturing corporation

See also 
 TTX (disambiguation)